Mask Man could refer to:
Hikari Sentai Maskman, Japanese television series
Mask Man (TV series), South Korean television series